Hashtag Khaleh Sooskeh is an Iranian fantasy and musical television series directed by Mohammad Moslemi and produced by Hassan Mostafavi. It has been produced in 15 episodes and aired on the Home Theater Network since February 2018.

Plot 
The City of Legends is repeated by the great demon under a spell. Meanwhile, on the night of the eleventh, Shahrzad the storyteller has arrived in the morning and the wedding celebration of Aunt Suske and Agha Moshe is to be held by the order of the great ruler; But it does not bring happiness…. The story of the film ended in a way that strengthens the continuity of this series and the possibility of making a second season

Cast
 Bahareh Kian Afshar
 Amir Hossein Rostami
 Arzhang Amirfazli
 Leila Bolukat
 Nilofar Rajaeifar
 Elham Hamidi
 Saeed Amirsoleimani
 Elnaz Habibi
 Sirous Hosseinifar
 Hossein Rahmani Manesh
 Laleh Sabouri

References

External links

Iranian television series
2017 establishments in Iran
2017 Iranian television series debuts